The black-chinned laughingthrush or rufous-breasted laughingthrush has been split into the following species:

 Nilgiri laughingthrush, Montecincla cachinnans
 Banasura laughingthrush, Montecincla jerdoni

Birds by common name